Julie Edel Hardenberg (born 1971) is a Greenlandic photographer whose picture books include The Quiet Diversity. Kuuk, curated by her and Iben Mondrup and hosted by The Nordic Institute in Greenland, explored Greenlandic identity.

References

External links 

Greenlandic women artists
Kalaallit
Women photographers
1971 births
Living people